The Rheumatology Research Foundation is the largest private funding source of rheumatology research and training in the United States. The Foundation is a 501(c)(3) charitable organization dedicated to improving the health of people living with rheumatic disease. With an extensive awards program, the Foundation is working to recruit and train the next generation of rheumatology health professionals. The Foundation advances research that leads to new treatments and, one day, cures.  The Foundation has received a 4-star rating, the highest offered by Charity Navigator, for eight consecutive years, which takes into account the company's governance, fiscal management and commitment to accountability & transparency.

References

https://www.rheumresearch.org

External links
 Rheumatology Research Foundation - Official site

Organizations established in 1985
Rheumatology organizations
Medical research institutes in the United States
Medical and health organizations based in Georgia (U.S. state)
1985 establishments in the United States
Research institutes in Georgia (state)